Brunei Darussalam participated in the 2010 Asian Games in Guangzhou, China on 12–27 November 2010.

Cue Sports

Men

Equestrian

Jumping
Individual

Fencing

Men

Karate

Men

Wushu

Women
Changquan

Nanquan\Nandao

Nations at the 2010 Asian Games
2010
Asian Games